The 2012 East–West Shrine Game was the 87th staging of the all-star college football exhibition game featuring NCAA Division I Football Bowl Subdivision players and a few select invitees from Canadian university football. The game featured over 100 players from the 2011 college football season, and prospects for the 2012 Draft of the professional National Football League (NFL). In the week prior to the game, scouts from all 32 NFL teams attended.  The proceeds from the East-West Shrine Game benefit Shriners Hospitals for Children. Brad Childress and Bobby Ross were named coaches on December 19, 2011.

This oldest all-star game was played on January 21, 2012, at 4 p.m. ET at the Tropicana Field. The radio broadcast team was Patrick Kinas and Brian Jordan in the radio booth, and Rick Berkey reporting from the sidelines. The Pat Tillman Award was presented to Tauren Poole (RB, Tennessee) as a player who "best exemplifies character, intelligence, sportsmanship and service".

Players

East Team
 Name, Pos., College
 Justin Bethel, CB, Presbyterian
 Emanuel Davis, CB, East Carolina
 Gary Gray, CB, Notre Dame
 R.J. Blanton, CB, Notre Dame
 Charles Brown, CB, North Carolina
 Micah Pellerin, CB, Hampton
 Josh Norman, CB, Coastal Carolina
 Matt Conrath, DL, Virginia
 Julian Miller, DL, West Virginia
 Jabaree Tuani, DL, Navy
 Kyle Wilber, DL, Wake Forest
 Akiem Hicks, DL, Regina
 Nick Jean-Baptiste, DL, Baylor
 Micanor Regis, DL, Miami
 Travian Robertson, DL, South Carolina
 Bruce Figgins, FB/TE, Georgia
 Brandon Lindsey, LB, Pittsburgh
 Najee Goode, LB, West Virginia
 Shawn Loiseau, LB, Merrimack
 Steven Erzinger, LB, Army
 Max Gruder, LB, Pittsburgh
 Joshua Linam, LB, Central Florida
 Nick Sukay, LB, Penn State
 Quentin Saulsberry, OC, Mississippi State
 Tyler Horn, OC, Miami
 Derek Dennis, OG, Temple
 Jeremiah Warren, OG, South Florida
 Desmond Wynn, OG, Rutgers
 Rishaw Johnson, OG, California-Pennsylvania
 Jeff Adams, OT, Columbia
 Lamar Holmes, OT, Southern Miss
 Joe Long, OT, Wayne State
 Bradley Sowell, OT, Mississippi
 Blair Walsh, K, Georgia
 Shawn Powell, P, Florida State
 B. J. Coleman, QB, Tennessee-Chattanooga
 Austin Davis, QB, Southern Miss
 John Brantley, QB, Florida
 Alfred Morris, RB, Florida Atlantic
 Tauren Poole, RB, Tennessee
 Davin Meggett, RB, Maryland
 Matt Daniels, S, Duke
 Jerrell Young, S, South Florida
 Christian Thompson, S, South Carolina State
 Tysyn Hartman, S, Kansas State
 Chase Ford, TE, Miami
 Emil Igwenagu, TE, Massachusetts
 Evan Rodriguez, TE, Temple
 Tim Benford, WR, Tennessee Tech
 LaRon Byrd, WR, Miami
 B.J. Cunningham, WR, Michigan State
 Kevin Hardy, WR, The Citadel
 Lance Lewis, WR, East Carolina
 Thomas Mayo, WR, California-Pennsylvania
 A.J. Jenkins, WR, Illinois

West Team
 Name, Pos., College
 Chris Greenwood, CB, Albion
 Brandon Hardin, CB, Oregon State
 Rodney McLeod, CB, Virginia
 Shaun Prater, CB, Iowa
 Keith Tandy, CB, West Virginia
 Trevin Wade, CB, Arizona
 Tyrone Crawford, DL, Boise State
 Kentrell Lockett, DL, Mississippi
 Arnaud Nadon, DL, Laval
 Justin Francis, DL, Rutgers
 Dominique Hamilton, DL, Missouri
 Vaughn Meatoga, DL, Hawaii
 Kaniela Tuipulotu, DL, Hawaii
 DaJohn Harris, DL, Southern California
 Jerry Franklin, LB, Arkansas
 Tank Carder, LB, Texas Christian
 Steven Johnson, LB, Kansas
 Brandon Marshall, LB, Nevada
 Josh Kaddu, LB, Oregon
 Ronnie Thomton, LB, Southern Miss
 David Snow, OC, Texas
 Moe Petrus, OC, Connecticut
 Brandon Brooks, OG, Miami (OH)
 Markus Zusevics, OG, Iowa
 Ben Heenan, OG, Saskatchewan
 Josh LeRibeus, OG, Southern Methodist
 Tom Compton, OT, South Dakota
 Ryan Miller, OT, Colorado
 Al Netter, OT, Northwestern
 Matt Reynolds, OT, Brigham Young
 Marcel Jones, OT, Nebraska
 Greg Zuerlein, K, Missouri Western State
 Matt Prewitt, P, Kentucky Christian
 Bryan Anger, P, California
 Tyler Hansen, QB, Colorado
 Chandler Harnish, QB, Northern Illinois
 Dan Persa, QB, Northwestern
 Lennon Creer, RB, Louisiana Tech
 Marc Tyler, RB, Southern California
 Bobby Rainey, RB, Western Kentucky
 Aaron Henry, S, Wisconsin
 Austin Cassidy, S, Nebraska
 Blake Gideon, S, Texas
 Duke Ihenaho, S, San Jose State
 Kevin Koger, TE, Michigan
 Cory Harkey, TE, UCLA
 George Bryan, TE, North Carolina State
 David Paulson, TE, Oregon
 Greg Childs, WR, Arkansas
 Junior Hemingway, WR, Michigan
 Dale Moss, WR, South Dakota State
 Tyler Shoemaker, WR, Boise State
 Jarius Wright, WR, Arkansas
 Devon Wylie, WR, Fresno State
 Darius Hanks, WR, Alabama

Game notes
 This was the third time the game was played in Florida; having been played the prior two years at the Florida Citrus Bowl in Orlando, this was the first time it was held in St. Petersburg.

Scoring summary

Statistics

2012 NFL Draft

References

External links
 Box score at ESPN

East-West Shrine Game
East–West Shrine Bowl
American football in Florida
Sports competitions in St. Petersburg, Florida
January 2012 sports events in the United States
East-West Shrine Game